Gerhard Narholz (born June 9, 1937) is an Austrian-American composer, arranger and conductor, dedicated to easy listening and film score music. Between 1958 and 1965 he wrote pop songs for artists such as Petula Clark, Heidi Brühl, Bill Ramsey and film scores for various German feature films and TV series. He also produced various instrumental pop albums for Polydor Germany and Tokyo (under his pseudonym Otto Sieben). In 1965, Narholz founded the Sonoton Recorded Music Library. Between 1970 and 1980 Narholz arranged, produced and conducted numerous LPs with large string orchestra under his pseudonym Norman Candler for Decca Records / Telefunken, Germany and King Records, Tokyo. 1971 Norman Candler received the "3 Star Award" from BBC London for "Best Album of the Year".

Narholz founded the record label Pro Viva, which is dedicated to contemporary classical music of living composers. He composed and produced Easy Listening albums for Sonoton and Intersound with artists such as Billy May, Horst Jankowski, Nelson Riddle, Les Brown, Ted Heath, Acker Bilk, Xavier Cugat, Geoff Bastow, and Franck Pourcel. 1980-2009 he concentrated on composing and producing production music for Sonoton. He is the president and co-owner of Sonoton Music GmbH & Co. KG, Munich, Germany.

References

External links
 Official Sonoton website
 
 Gerhard Narholz's writing & arrangement credits at Discogs

1937 births
Living people
Austrian male composers
Austrian composers
Easy listening musicians